Wondervu is an unincorporated community in Boulder and Gilpin counties in the U.S. state of Colorado. It lies within a valley known as Coal Creek Canyon and is a part of the larger census-designated place of Coal Creek. The settlement was developed in the late 1920s and the early 1930s by the prominent Denver lawyer Otto Friedrichs as a vacation community for the working class.

All businesses and homes in the village have a Golden ZIP Code. Businesses in Wondervu include the Wondervu Café.

The welcome sign for the village of Wondervu is near the junction of Coal Creek Canyon Road and Ramona Road.

References

External links
Wondervu Cafe
Eldora Lodge

Census-designated places in Boulder County, Colorado
Census-designated places in Colorado